William Hackney Warren (February 11, 1884 – January 28, 1960), nicknamed "Hack", was a Major League Baseball player. He batted and threw right-handed.

He was born in Missouri and died at his home in Whiteville, Tennessee.

External links

1884 births
1960 deaths
Major League Baseball catchers
Newark Peppers players
Indianapolis Hoosiers players
Baseball players from Missouri
Minor league baseball managers
Oshkosh Indians players
Dallas Giants players
Dayton Veterans players
People from Whiteville, Tennessee